Sarbjit Singh Dusang (born 6 September 1952 in Powadra, Punjab, India) is an Indian-born Canadian former field hockey player who competed in the 1976 Summer Olympics.

References

External links
 

1952 births
Living people
Sportspeople from Jalandhar
Field hockey players from Punjab, India
Indian emigrants to Canada
Canadian people of Punjabi descent
Canadian sportspeople of Indian descent
Canadian male field hockey players
Olympic field hockey players of Canada
Field hockey players at the 1976 Summer Olympics
Pan American Games medalists in field hockey
Pan American Games silver medalists for Canada
Field hockey players at the 1975 Pan American Games
Field hockey players at the 1979 Pan American Games
Medalists at the 1975 Pan American Games
Medalists at the 1979 Pan American Games